Digital Smoke is a collaboration album by West Coast rapper Kurupt and West Coast rapper/producer J. Wells. The album was released June 5, 2007. It features many other rappers such as Tha Alkaholiks, Roscoe, Goodie Mob, Knoc-turn'al and Kokane. There is a music video for the song "All We Smoke," featuring cameo appearances by Bishop Lamont, 40 Glocc and Glasses Malone.

Track listing

Notes
"I'm Just Sayin'" contains background vocals by Nire
"Summertime" contains background vocals by Kurupt and Nire
"Smokin'" contains additional vocals by Drew Sidora and Kurupt
"Los Angeles" contains additional vocals by Samuel "Shorty" Christian
Ervin "EP" Pope - keyboards on tracks 7, 9, 15
Keenan "Kee Note" Holloway - bass on tracks 7, 15
Yonatan Elkayim - guitar and bass on track 9
Russ "Finesse" Barber - piano and fender rhodes on track 16
 
Sample credits
"Got Me Going" contains samples from "You Really Got Me" performed by The Kinks and "Danger" performed by Blahzay Blahzay
"Summertime" contains a sample from "Dial My Heart" performed by The Boys
"I Came in the Door" contains samples from "Eric B. Is President" performed by Eric B. & Rakim, "I Ain't No Joke" performed by Eric B. & Rakim and 10% Dis performed by MC Lyte feat. Audio Two

Personnel
Credits for Digital Smoke adapted from Allmusic.

Big Gipp - Primary Artist
Blaqtoven - Composer
Butch Cassidy - Primary Artist, Vocals
Claudio Cueni - Mixing
James DeBarge - Primary Artist
Goodie Mob - Guest Artist, Primary Artist
Gail Gotti - Primary Artist
Keenan "Kee Note" Holloway - Bass
Craig King - Keyboards, Producer
Knoc-Turn'al - Primary Artist
Kokane - Guest Artist, Primary Artist
Kurupt - Executive Producer, Primary Artist, Vocals
Tha Liks - Primary Artist
Victor Manzano - Engineer
Ervin Pope - Keyboards
Russell Redeaux - Management
Marc Regan - Mastering
Roscoe - Primary Artist
Shorty - Primary Artist
Ms. Drew Sidora - Vocals
Stylistic Jones - Primary Artist
Tha Alkaholiks - Guest Artist
Tri-Star - Primary Artist
J. Wells - Engineer, Executive Producer, Guitar, Keyboards, Primary Artist, Producer
Y. A. - Primary Artist

References

Kurupt albums
2007 albums
Albums produced by DJ Quik